WDMC-LD, virtual channel 25 (UHF digital channel 20), is a low-powered Daystar owned-and-operated television station licensed to Charlotte, North Carolina, United States. The station is owned by the Word of God Fellowship.  In November 2012, the station switched from analog to digital.

Digital channel
The station's digital signal is multiplexed:

History

References

External links

Low-power television stations in the United States
DMC-LD
Religious television stations in the United States